Mycena epipterygia is a species of fungi in the family Mycenaceae of mushrooms commonly found in Europe. It is commonly known as yellowleg bonnet. The species is saprotrophic and its appearance is quite variable. For example, a number of members of the genus Mycena, some parts of the fungus are bioluminescent, including in this species, the mycelium. Mycena nivicola has been suggested as a separate species name for the Western variety.

Distribution and habitat
M. epipterygia is a common species in Western Europe (amongst others Netherlands and Belgium). It grows in diverse habitats: in deciduous and coniferous woods, but it is also found in heather and acid grasslands, amongst grasses and mosses. This species grows on the ground. In Britain, the fruiting bodies appear from August to November. In the North American Pacific Northwest, the species appears in groups, in needle litter and on wood.

Description 
The cap is striate, bell-shaped at first, but becoming convex, or occasionally nearly flat with the margin turning up slightly. The margin is somewhat irregular, and the flesh white and fragile.

The gills are white to cream, sometimes tinged with pink when older; they are fairly widely spaced, adnate, or slightly decurrent. The spores are amyloidic and have a length of 8 to 10 micrometres and a width of 4 to 5.5 micrometres. The spore print is white to very pale buff.

Edibility
The species is considered edible, but is of little interest in the kitchen.

Similar species
The species resembles Mycena aurantiidisca, M. clavicularis, M. leptocephala, and Roridomyces roridus.

See also
 List of bioluminescent fungi

References

External links
 

epipterygia
Fungi of North America
Fungi of Europe